Odd Couple may refer to:

Neil Simon play and its adaptations
 The Odd Couple (play), a 1965 stage play by Neil Simon
 The Odd Couple (film), a 1968 film based on the play
 The Odd Couple (1970 TV series), a 1970–1975 television show based on the film
 The Oddball Couple, a 1975–1977 animated TV series
 The New Odd Couple, a 1982–1983 sitcom remake
 The Odd Couple (2015 TV series), a 2015 remake
 The Odd Couple II, 1998 sequel to the 1968 film
 The Female Odd Couple, a version adapted by Simon in 1985 with the gender roles reversed

Other
 Odd Couple (1979 film), (搏命單刀奪命搶) a kung fu film
 Odd Couple (2022 film), a drama
 The Odd Couple (album), a 2008 album by Gnarls Barkley
 "Odd Couples", episode of The Suite Life of Zack & Cody
 "Odd Couple", episode of The Fairly OddParents

See also
 Couple (disambiguation)
 "Really Odd Couple", episode of The Grim Adventures of Billy & Mandy
 Buddy film, a film genre featuring a mismatched pair of lead characters, sometimes described as an "odd couple" pairing